2010 Masters may refer to:
 2010 Masters Tournament, golf
2010 Masters (snooker)
2010 Monte-Carlo Rolex Masters, tennis
2010 ATP World Tour Masters 1000, tennis
2010 Deutsche Tourenwagen Masters season, touring car racing
2010 Masters of Formula 3
2010 International Formula Master season, motor racing
2010 ADAC Formel Masters season, open wheel racing
2010 Radical European Masters, motor racing
2010 National Masters, English indoor football